The House of Officers is a military/cultural building in Almaty, Kazakhstan. It serves troops and other personnel of the Almaty Military Garrison. Currently, the building houses the Museum of the Great Patriotic War, as well as other small organizations. From 1995–2012, the building housed the Central Military Band of the Ministry of Defense of Kazakhstan. Since November 1993, the building has been part the Almaty State Historical-Architectural and Memorial Reserve.

Building 
The building was erected in 1978 in front of the eastern entrance to Park of 28 Panfilov Guardsmen. The main 4-story building is made in a monolithic reinforced concrete frame with brick filled walls. The facade of the building leads to the Eternal Flame of the Glory Memorial, which is decorated with chased copper and white marble colonnade. 

The building includes the following halls:
Concert hall
Lecture hall
Cinema
Restaurant
Dance hall
Rehearsal halls
Art studio
Administrative rooms

References

Buildings and structures in Almaty
Government buildings completed in 1978
Military installations of Kazakhstan
Museums in Almaty
Buildings and structures completed in 1978
Museums established in 1978
1978 establishments in the Soviet Union
Military locations of the Soviet Union